Nahda University in Beni Suef (NUB) is located in Upper Egypt. It was established in 2006. It is a private university run by the Thebes Education Group.

References

External links 
 Official Website

Universities in Egypt
Educational institutions established in 2006
2006 establishments in Egypt